The following table shows the world record progression in the men's and women's triple jump, officially ratified by the IAAF.

Men

The first world record in the men's triple jump was recognised by the International Association of Athletics Federations in 1912. That inaugural record was the 15.52 m performance by Dan Ahearn in 1911.

As of June 21, 2009, 27 world records have been ratified by the IAAF in the event. The men's triple jump world record is unusual in that on five occasions a new record has been set and then broken again on the same day.

Women
The first world record in the women's triple jump was recognised by the International Association of Athletics Federations in 1990.

As of June 21, 2009, the IAAF has ratified 5 world records in the event.

Unofficial pre-IAAF progression to 1990

Official IAAF progression from 1990

Women's triple jump progression controversy 

Inessa Kravets was found guilty of doping offenses in 1993, after her 1991 record and before setting her long-standing 1995 record. She was later banned for two years in 2000, leading many to doubt the legitimacy of her performance.

References

Triple jump
Triple jump
World record
Men's world athletics record progressions